Dan Drinan (born July 4, 1960) is an American sprint car driver from Indianapolis who failed on three separate attempts to qualify for the Indianapolis 500. His first attempt came in 1996, the first year that the Indy Racing League sanctioned the race. Drinan crashed his 1991 Lola chassis, the oldest chassis entered as a potential qualifier, during practice although it is unlikely that his outdated chassis and Buick engine could have produced the speed necessary to make the field. Drinan bruised his lung and fractured his foot in the crash. He returned in 1998 and his Mann Motorsports Dallara again failed to find the necessary speed to make the field. His final attempt was in 2000, when he was given an outdated Dallara and a small crew by Hemelgarn Racing, but the car never handled properly and Drinan again crashed during practice, preventing him from qualifying. Drinan has continued to be a top level competitor in USAC sprint car and midget racing. After leaving the IWX team through force, he now is supporting his young son in his own racing program Danny Drinan Jr who has promising potential for the future to come.  In 2013-2016, Drinan and his son competed in USAC & QMA quarter midget competition in a creation out of Drinan's shop called the "F1 Shark" and had great success, winning a number of races.  His son then moved on to run 600CC micro sprints after that.

IRL IndyCar Series

References

1960 births
Living people
Racing drivers from Indianapolis
USAC Silver Crown Series drivers